Iván Rodríguez Mesa (born January 22, 1977) is a Panamanian former swimmer, who specialized in breaststroke events. He is a single-time Olympian (2000) and a member of the Arizona State Sun Devils swimming and diving team under head coach Mike Chasson.

Rodriguez competed only in the men's 100 m breaststroke at the 2000 Summer Olympics in Sydney. He achieved a FINA B-standard entry time of 1:04.52 from the Pan American Games in Winnipeg, Manitoba, Canada. He challenged seven other swimmers in heat five, including Israel's top favorite Tal Stricker and Chinese Taipei's 16-year-old Yang Shang-hsuan. He raced to sixth place in a time of 1:04.68, trailing Mexico's Alfredo Jacobo by a hundredth of a second (0.01). Rodriguez failed to advance into the semifinals, as he placed forty-fourth overall on the first day of prelims.

References

1977 births
Living people
Panamanian male swimmers
Olympic swimmers of Panama
Swimmers at the 1999 Pan American Games
Swimmers at the 2000 Summer Olympics
Male breaststroke swimmers
Sportspeople from Panama City
Arizona State Sun Devils men's swimmers
Pan American Games competitors for Panama